Kevin D. Jensen (born August 18, 1954) is an American politician. He is a Republican representing District 16 in the South Dakota House of Representatives.

Political career 

Jensen ran for election to represent one of District 16's two seats in 2012 and 2014, but lost the Republican primaries. In 2016, he ran again and won, and was re-elected in 2018. He is running for another term in 2020.

As of October 2020, Jensen sat on the following committees:
 Health and Human Services (Chair)
 State Affairs
 Joint Health & Human Services Interim Committee (Co-chair)
 Mental Health Services Delivery Task Force (Chair)

Jensen has served as a Majority Whip since 2019.

Electoral record 

In 2018, Anderson and Jensen were unopposed in the Republican primary.

References 

1954 births
Living people
People from Canton, South Dakota
Republican Party members of the South Dakota House of Representatives
21st-century American politicians